Wyoming Highway 451 (WYO 451) is a  east-west Wyoming State Road in Weston County that acts as a spur from U.S. Route 16 at Osage west to Weston County Routes 22 and 36B.

Route description
Wyoming Highway 451 begins its western end west of Osage at Weston County Route 22 and County Route 36B just west of Beaver Creek in the Thunder Basin National Grassland.  County Route 22 (Oil City Road) is the continuation of the roadway westward. WYO 451 heads west and ends at US 16 in the census-designated place (CDP) of Osage.

Major intersections

See also

 List of state highways in Wyoming
 List of highways numbered 451

References

External links

 Wyoming State Routes 400-499
 Thunder Basin National Grassland federal website

Transportation in Weston County, Wyoming
451